Bazman District is a district (bakhsh) in Iranshahr County, Sistan and Baluchestan province, Iran. At the 2006 census, its population was 13,409, in 2,663 families. The district has one city: Bazman. The district has two rural districts (dehestan): Abreis Rural District and Bazman Rural District. At the 2016 census, its population was 11,827.

References 

Iranshahr County
Districts of Sistan and Baluchestan Province
Populated places in Iranshahr County